Flóris Korb (born as Flóris Nándor Korb, Kecskemét, 7 April 1860 – Budapest, 16 September 1930) was a Hungarian architect.

Career
After finishing his studies in Berlin, he returned to Budapest to work under Alajos Hauszmann for fourteen years, during which time he took part in designing the New York Palace. In 1893 he entered into a partnership with Kálmán Giergl which resulted in many important commissions in the developing capital. Korb was awarded with the Greguss prize in 1924 and was admitted into the Royal Institute of British of Architects.

Works
 New York Palace, with Hauszmann & Giergl (1891–95)
Croatian Art Pavilion at the Millennium Exhibition in Budapest (1896), with Giergl
 Klotild Palaces, Budapest (1899–1902) :hu:Klotild paloták
 Kiraly Apartments, Budapest (1900–01)
 Franz Liszt Academy of Music, Budapest (1904–07)
 Clinic buildings, Mari and Ulloi ut, Budapest
 Central University Library of Cluj-Napoca (w. Kálmán Giergl, 1904–1909)
 Commercial Savings and Insurance Bank (today Press Building), Kecskemét (1909–12)
 Mint Building, Budapest
 Debrecen University, (1914–30)
 Zielinski Water Tower, Szeged (1903–04)

References 

1860 births
1930 deaths
19th-century Hungarian people
20th-century Hungarian people
Hungarian architects
People from Kecskemét
Hungarian people of German descent